Juan Salcedo Jr. was a former Secretary of the Department of Health in the Philippines.  He was also one of the original board of trustees and incorporators of the Philippine Rural Reconstruction Movement.

References

See also
Nutrition Foundation of the Philippines, Inc., a Philippine non-profit organization that Dr. Salcedo Jr. founded

Filipino educators
National Scientists of the Philippines
Secretaries of Health of the Philippines
Burials at the Libingan ng mga Bayani
Quirino administration cabinet members